The driftwood catfishes are catfishes of the family Auchenipteridae. The two genera of the former family Ageneiosidae have been placed here, resulting in a grouping of about 125 species in about 22 genera.

These fish are found in rivers from Panama to Argentina, commonly in river flood plains.

All but one species have three pairs of barbels, with the nasal barbels absent. Most species have very small adipose fins. The eggs are fertilised internally.

Driftwood catfishes are nocturnal. Some of the smaller species are known to hide in logs and crevices during the day, and come out to feed at night. Some larger species can consume fruits and insects, and are probably omnivorous. Fish of this family seem to feed primarily on insects, but also eat fish, shrimp, fruit, and even filamentous algae and other plant material, at least occasionally.

References

 
Fish of South America
Fish of Central America
Taxa named by Pieter Bleeker